Tyrannochromis nigriventer is a species of cichlid endemic to Lake Malawi where it prefers rocky shallows.  This species can reach a length of  SL.

References

nigriventer
Fish described in 1989
Taxonomy articles created by Polbot